H.H.F. "Herman" Wijffels (born 13 March 1942) is a retired Dutch politician of the Christian Democratic Appeal (CDA) party and businessman.

From 1981 to 1999 he worked for the Rabobank ultimately as chairman of the board of directors and from 15 March 1999 until 1 April 2006 he was chairman of the Social-Economic Council (Sociaal-Economische Raad, SER). From 2006 to 2008 he was the Dutch representative at the World Bank, succeeding Ad Melkert. For the 2006-2007 Dutch cabinet formation, Wijffels was recommended by informateur Rein Jan Hoekstra to lead the negotiations between the CDA, PvdA and ChristianUnion. On 22 December 2006 Queen Beatrix appointed him as Hoekstra's successor as informateur. He has been referred to as "the best prime minister the Netherlands never had".

He has been involved in supporting many causes since his retirement from the SER as his biography by Jan Smit illustrates. On leaving the SER, he demonstrated his bridging role by bringing together people from his traditional world and alternative world in a leaving event with Prof Ervin Laszlo, Dr Don Beck and Peter Merry. He repeated this with a major event focused on societal transformation in the Netherlands called Klaar om te Wenden (which translates as the sailing term "Ready About!").

Decorations

Honorary degrees

References

External links

Official
  Dr. H.H.F. (Herman) Wijffels Parlement & Politiek

 

 

 
 

 

1942 births
Living people
Catholic People's Party politicians
Chairmen of the Social and Economic Council
Christian Democratic Appeal politicians
Commanders of the Order of Orange-Nassau
Dutch academic administrators
Dutch bankers
Dutch business writers
Dutch chief executives in the finance industry
Dutch corporate directors
Dutch expatriates in the United States
Dutch financial advisors
Dutch financial analysts
Dutch financial writers
Dutch lobbyists
Dutch nonprofit directors
Dutch nonprofit executives
Dutch Roman Catholics
Dutch trade association executives
International economists
International Monetary Fund people
Knights of the Order of the Netherlands Lion
Monetarists
Monetary economists
People from Maarn
People from Sluis
Tilburg University alumni
Academic staff of Tilburg University
Academic staff of Utrecht University
World Bank people
20th-century Dutch businesspeople
20th-century Dutch civil servants
20th-century Dutch economists
20th-century Dutch educators
20th-century Dutch male writers
20th-century Dutch politicians
21st-century Dutch businesspeople
21st-century Dutch civil servants
21st-century Dutch economists
21st-century Dutch educators
21st-century Dutch male writers
21st-century Dutch politicians